Piero Lulli (1 February 1923 – 23 June 1991) was an Italian film actor. He appeared in 111 films between 1942 and 1977. He was the younger brother of actor Folco Lulli.

Selected filmography

 A Pilot Returns (1942) - De Santis
 Love Story (1942) - Gianni Castelli
 Knights of the Desert (1942)
 Uno tra la folla (1946) - Renato
 Tragic Hunt (1947) - L'autista
 L'eroe della strada (1948) - Paolo
 How I Lost the War (1948) - Ufficiale tedesco sul ponte
 Vertigine d'amore (1949) - Olivero / France: Ollivier Desmichels
 Cintura di castità (1950)
 Rapture (1950)
 Il sentiero dell'odio (1950)
 Song of Spring (1951) - Ugo
 Anna (1951) - Il dottor Manzi
 Operation Mitra (1951)
 Frontier Wolf (1952) - Guido
 Infame accusa (1953) - Marco
 Riscatto (1953) - Rizieri Chiari
 Viva la rivista! (1953)
 Core furastiero (1953) - Giovanni
 Condannata senza colpa (1953) - Barbe Zef
 La prigioniera di Amalfi (1954) - Carlo
 Acque amare (1954) - Leo Ferri
 Ulysses (1954) - Achilles
 Ultima illusione (1954) - Mario
 La campana di San Giusto (1954) - Bruno Visentini
 Di qua, di là del Piave (1954)
 Yalis, la vergine del Roncador (1955)
 Supreme Confession (1956) - Franz
 Pezzo, capopezzo e capitano (1958) - Franco
 Captain Falcon (1958) - Lupo
 I cattivi vanno in paradiso (1959) - Il sacerdote
 Wolves of the Deep (1959) - Teppista
 Il principe fusto (1960)
 The Huns (1960) - Seikor
 Vacanze in Argentina (1960)
 The Last of the Vikings (1961) - Hardak - uomo di Sveno (uncredited)
 Sword Without a Country (1961) - Benedetto
 Duel of the Titans (1961) - Sulpicius
 Hawk of the Caribbean (1962) - Manuel
 Samson Against the Sheik (1962) - Ramiro
 Julius Caesar Against The Pirates (1962) - Edom
 Passport for a Corpse (1962) - Piero
 Charge of the Black Lancers (1962)
 Gladiator of Rome (1962) - General Astarte
 The Fury of Achilles (1962) - Odysseus
 Attack of the Normans (1962) - Barton
 The Defeat of the Barbarians (1962) - Manfredi
 Duel at the Rio Grande (1963) - Herrero
 The Sign of the Coyote (1963) - Lenny
 Goliath and the Sins of Babylon (1963) - Pergasos
 The Beast of Babylon Against the Son of Hercules (1963) - Balthazar
 The Organizer (1963) - (uncredited)
 Revenge of the Musketeers (1963)
 Hercules and the Black Pirates (1964) - Rodrigo Sanchez
 Parias de la gloire (1964)
 The Triumph of Hercules (1964) - Euristeo
 The Two Gladiators (1964) - Cleandro
 Revolt of the Praetorians (1964) - Domiziano
 Giants of Rome (1964) - Pompeus
 The Beast of Babylon Against the Son of Hercules (1964) - Wrestler #3
 Gladiators Seven (1964) - Silone
 Bullet in the Flesh (1964) - Jonathan
 Buffalo Bill, Hero of the Far West (1965) - Red
 Goliath at the Conquest of Damascus (1965) - Thor
 Conqueror of Atlantis (1965) - Ramir
 Challenge of the Gladiator (1965) - Consul Metello
 Hands of a Gunfighter (1965) - Davy Castle
 Una ráfaga de plomo (1965)
 Savage Gringo (1966) - Bill Carter
 Kill, Baby, Kill (1966) - Inspector Kruger
 Per il gusto di uccidere (1966) - Collins
 Rojo (1966) - Lasky
 Fury of Johnny Kid (1967) - Sheriff Cooper
 Kitosch, the Man Who Came from the North (1967) - Major Zachary Backer
 Adios, Hombre (1967) - Luke Brabham
 Django Kill (1967) - Oaks
 Cjamango (1967) - El Tigre
 The Dirty Outlaws (1967) - Sam
 Gente d'onore (1967)
 Ringo, il cavaliere solitario (1968) - Daniel G. Samuelson
 Un diablo bajo la almohada (1968) - Rafael
 Vengeance Is My Forgiveness (1968) - John Kildare
 Pistol for a Hundred Coffins (1968) - Jurago
 God Made Them... I Kill Them (1968) - Sheriff Lancaster
 All on the Red (1968) - Laszlo
 OSS 117 – Double Agent (1968) - Heindrich Van Dyck - un rappresentante dell'ONU
 Pistol for a Hundred Coffins (1968) - J. Texas Corbett
 Find a Place to Die (1968) - Paul Martin
 Dead Men Don't Count (1968) - Sheriff Bob Watson
 Hell Commandos (1969) - Col. Kreuzfeld
 The Forgotten Pistolero (1969) - Francisco
 Eros e Thanatos (1969)
 The Avenger, Zorro (1969) - Buck
 Sartana's Here… Trade Your Pistol for a Coffin (1970) - Samuel Spencer
 Chapaqua (1970) - Major / Captain Garrett
 When Heroes Die (1970) - Erwin Rommel
 Cloud of Dust... Cry of Death... Sartana Is Coming (1970) - Grand Full
 My Dear Killer (1972) -  Alessandro Moroni
 The Boldest Job in the West (1972) - Jeremias
 Come fu che Masuccio Salernitano, fuggendo con le brache in mano, riuscì a conservarlo sano (1972) - Fra' Jeronimo
 My Name is Nobody (1973) - Sheriff
 The Fighting Fist of Shanghai Joe (1973) - Stanley Spencer
 Il figlio della sepolta viva (1974) - Amadeus
 Young Lucrezia (1974) - Ludovico Maria Sforza 'il Moro'
 Carambola's Philosophy: In the Right Pocket (1975) - Colonel
 Zwei tolle Hechte – Wir sind die Größten (1975) - Minstrel / El Moro
 Nazi Love Camp 27 (1977) - General at the Nazi Brothel

References

External links

1923 births
1991 deaths
20th-century Italian male actors
Italian male film actors
Actors from Florence
Male Spaghetti Western actors